The Gunaikurnai or Gunai/Kurnai people, also referred to as the Gunnai or Kurnai, are an Aboriginal Australian nation of south-east Australia. They are the Traditional Custodians of most of present-day Gippsland and much of the southern slopes of the Victorian Alps. The Gunaikurnai nation is composed of five major clans. Many of the Gunaikurnai people resisted early European squatting and subsequent settlement during the nineteenth century, resulting in a number of deadly confrontations between Europeans and the Gunaikurnai. There are about 3,000 Gunaikurnai people alive today, predominantly living in Gippsland. The Gunaikurnai dialects are the traditional language of the Gunaikurnai people, although there are very few fluent speakers today.

Creation story
It is told that the first Kurnai came down from the north west mountains, with his canoe on his head. He was known as Borun, the pelican. He crossed the Tribal River (where Sale now stands) and walked on into the west to Tarra Warackel (Port Albert). He heard a constant tapping sound, as he walked, but could not identify it. At the deep water of the inlets Borun put down his canoe and discovered, much to his surprise, there was a woman in it. She was Tuk, the musk duck. He was very happy to see her and she became his wife and the mother of the Gunaikurnai people.

In scientific terms, evidence of human occupation at Cloggs Cave near Buchan, has been dated at up to 17,000 years, while occupation at New Guinea Cave in the same area has been dated to over 20,000 years.

Clan names
The name of this Aboriginal nation has been alternatively written in such forms as Gunai, Kurnai, Gunnai, and Ganai. As a compromise, the group is now often referred to as the Gunaikurnai or Gunai/Kurnai. The names of clans or tribes have also attracted a number of alternative spellings. Alternative names arose as Aboriginal languages had no written form before European settlement. Thus Aboriginal words and tribal names can have many alternative spellings, as the oral transmission from the Indigenous people may have been heard or recorded differently by various early European sources. It is also possible that the European sources correctly recorded alternative pronunciations and dialects of the indigenous people.

Clans and languages

The Kurnai nation is made up of five major clans or tribes. Various closely related dialects were spoken among the people of the region in pre-European times, although these have now been largely lost.
Each clan spoke a different dialect with its own name, though these different names may largely reflect recording differences of early Europeans as discussed above. The clans are summarised in the table below:

Neighbouring nations
The Kurnai nation was bordered to the west of the Brataualung and Braiakalung by the lands of the Kulin nation centred on present day Melbourne, specifically the Wurundjeri and Boonwurrung clans. To the east, bordering the Krauatungalung from around Cann River and out to Mallacoota, were the Bidawal people. To the north, in the Australian Alps and around the upper Murray River, were a number of clans, including the Jaitmathang whose lands bordered the Brabawooloong south of Omeo.

According to European accounts, the Gunaikurnai nation were actively fighting with the Boonwurrung at the time of European invasion. There are records of a "Warrowen massacre" in present-day Brighton which saw invading Gunaikurnai warriors of the Borro Borro willun clan wipe out around 60 Boonwurrung Yowenjerre clan members, effectively eliminating the clan and allowing the Gunaikurnai to occupy Boonwurrung lands near Wilsons Promontory. However, there is little record of the Borro Borro willun clan outside of this incident.

Resistance to European settlement

The Kurnai people resisted the European invasion of their land. It is extremely difficult to ascertain the numbers killed in the guerilla warfare undertaken, or the numbers who died in the massacres that were inflicted upon the Gunaikurnai by the superior weaponry of the Europeans. A partial list from letters and diaries for an exhibition called Koorie, mounted by the Museum of Victoria in 1991, included:
 1840 – Nuntin- unknown number killed by Angus McMillan's men
 1840 – Boney Point – "Angus McMillan and his men took a heavy toll of Aboriginal lives"
 1841 – Butchers Creek – 30-35 shot by Angus McMillan's men
 1841 – Maffra – unknown number shot by Angus McMillan's men
 1842 – Skull Creek – unknown number killed
 1842 – Bruthen Creek – "hundreds killed"
 1843 – Warrigal Creek – between 60 and 180 shot by Angus McMillan and his men
 1844 – Maffra – unknown number killed
 1846 – South Gippsland – 14 killed
 1846 – Snowy River – 8 killed by Captain Dana and the Aboriginal Police
 1846-47 – Central Gippsland – 50 or more shot by armed party hunting for a white woman supposedly held by Aborigines; no such woman was ever found
 1850 – East Gippsland – 15-20 killed
 1850 – Murrindal – 16 poisoned
 1850 – Brodribb River – 15-20 killed

In 1846 Gippsland squatter Henry Meyrick wrote in a letter home to his relatives in England:
The blacks are very quiet here now, poor wretches. No wild beast of the forest was ever hunted down with such unsparing perseverance as they are. Men, women and children are shot whenever they can be met with … I have protested against it at every station I have been in Gippsland, in the strongest language, but these things are kept very secret as the penalty would certainly be hanging … For myself, if I caught a black actually killing my sheep, I would shoot him with as little remorse as I would a wild dog, but no consideration on earth would induce me to ride into a camp and fire on them indiscriminately, as is the custom whenever the smoke is seen. They [the Aborigines] will very shortly be extinct. It is impossible to say how many have been shot, but I am convinced that not less than 500 have been murdered altogether.

In 1863 Rev Friedrich Hagenauer established Rahahyuck Mission on the banks of the Avon River near Lake Wellington to house the Gunaikurnai survivors from west and central Gippsland. The mission sought to discourage all tribal ritual and culture.  The Mission closed in 1908 and the few remaining residents were moved to the Lake Tyers Mission.

Native Title Agreement
The Kurnai launched a native title claim in 1997 following on from the successful Mabo native title case of 1992. On 22 October 2010 the case was settled in the Federal Court under the Native Title Act (1993). The Court recognised the Gunaikurnai as traditional owners, and found that they held native title over much of Gippsland. Based on these findings the Victorian Government entered into an agreement with the Gunaikurnai on the same day, the first agreement reached under the Traditional Owner Settlement Act (2010) 

Maps of the area covered under the agreement and the native title determination shows that it does not fully cover the entire area thought to comprise the traditional lands of the Gunaikurnai, however most of the original nation is covered. Notable exclusions are to the west, including Wilsons Promontory, to the east of the Snowy River, and exclusions in the north, particularly the northeast region. Only Crown land within the area is affected by the determination and agreement, with all existing rights on Crown land being protected for their full term, and there being no impact in any way in relation to private land.

The agreement included the following key points:
 ten national parks and reserves were transferred to the Gunaikurnai to be jointly managed with the State. The parks and reserves are The Knob Reserve at Stratford, Tarra-Bulga National Park, Mitchell River National Park, The Lakes National Park, Gippsland Lakes Coastal Park, New Guinea Cave in the Snowy River National Park, Buchan Caves Reserve, Land in the Lake Tyers catchment area, Gippsland Lakes Reserve at Raymond Island, and Corringle Foreshore Reserve at the mouth of the Snowy River.
 the Gunaikurnai people have rights to access and use Crown land for traditional purposes within existing laws. These uses can include hunting, fishing, camping, and gathering.
 funding to be provided to the Gunaikurnai for the purposes of managing their affairs, for investment in economic development and strengthening of their cultural identity, and to meet their obligations under the settlement. The total value of the funding is A$12 million, contributed to equally by the State and Federal Governments. $2 million was to be paid to Gunaikurnai at the time the settlement came into force, with the remaining $10 million invested through an independent trust to provide income for purposes outlined previously for a period of at least twenty years.

Places named after the Gunaikurnai 
 Kurnai College is a Victorian state school in the Latrobe Valley of Gippsland, which is in the western part of the Gunaikurnai's traditional nation, in the lands of the Brayakooloong clan. It has campuses in the towns of Morwell and Churchill.
 Krowathunkooloong Keeping Place is an Aboriginal culture, history and heritage museum located in Bairnsdale in Brabawooloong country. It is named for the Krowathunkooloong clan that occupied the Orbost and Snowy River area. It houses displays related to Aboriginal culture, history, arts and crafts, with the aim of raising the profile, awareness, understanding and pride in the Gunaikurnai people's history in Gippsland. The museum was first named in 1991 and opened to the public in 1994.

Notable Gunaikurnai people 
 John Gorrie (born 1950), Aboriginal liaison officer, child protection worker and elder
 Veronica 'Ronnie' Gorrie (born 1971/1972), writer
 Albert Mullet (1933-2014), community leader and craftsman
 Lidia Thorpe, Victorian Greens Politician, former MP for Northcote. First Aboriginal woman elected to the Parliament of Victoria.

See also
 Alfred William Howitt
 Gippsland massacres
 Gunaikurnai language
 Warrigal Creek
 White woman of Gippsland

Notes

Citations

Sources

Bibliography

External links
 Djeetgun Kurnai Women's Aboriginal Corporation
 Bataluk Cultural trail
 "Wurruk: Earth-Story", A literary dreaming/self-portrait written partly in Kurnai – Gunai

Aboriginal peoples of Victoria (Australia)
Gippsland (region)